"Lollipop" is a song by American rapper Lil Wayne, issued as the lead single from his sixth studio album, Tha Carter III. The track posthumously features vocals from American singer Static Major and was produced by Deezle and Jim Jonsin. It heavily utilizes the Auto-Tune vocal effect. The song was released digitally on March 13, 2008.

"Lollipop" is Lil Wayne and Static Major's most successful single to date, spending five non-consecutive weeks atop the Billboard Hot 100 chart. Static Major died on February 25, 2008, approximately two weeks before the song's release, making it the eighth to hit number one after the death of a credited artist. There are various versions of the song. The single was certified Diamond by the RIAA for selling ten million units in the United States and was ranked the number one hip hop song of 2008 by MTV. The song reached number one on the 2008 issue of Notarized by BET. The song was ranked at number five on Rolling Stones list of the 100 Best Songs of 2008. With 9.1 million copies sold as of January 2009, "Lollipop" was named 2008's best-selling digital single worldwide by IFPI.

Music video 

The music video was directed by Gil Green and filmed in Las Vegas at Gavin Maloof's residence on December 31, 2007. The video premiered via BET's Access Granted on March 12, 2008. It also reached number one on TRL in April on MTV.

The limousine that Wayne and Static get into at the start of the video is based on an International XT pickup truck.

The video is the most-viewed video on Music Choice's video on demand service.

Jim Jonsin, Tyga, Jay Rock, Birdman and Mack 10 make cameos in the video.

The final frame of the video is a picture of Static praying with the words "In memory of Stephen "Static Major" Garrett".

Chart performance 
The song won a Grammy Award in February 2009 for Best Rap Song.

Static Major died unexpectedly during a medical procedure on February 25, 2008, sixteen days before the song was released. "Lollipop" jumped 76 spots from number 85 to number 9 on the March 28, 2008 issue of the Billboard Hot 100, becoming Lil' Wayne's highest-charting single as a lead artist, along with being his first top ten hit on the chart as a lead artist. His previous highest-charting position as a lead artist was with "Go D.J.", which peaked at number 14 in 2004. The following week, it reached a new peak of number 7 on the Hot 100. The single reached a new peak of number 2 on the Billboard Hot 100 on April 17, 2008, making it his highest-charting single as both a lead artist or as a featured performer. (Lil Wayne was a featured artist for Destiny's Child's number 3 (Hot 100) hit, "Soldier".) For the week of May 3, 2008, "Lollipop" reached the number-one spot on the Hot 100, his first number one on the chart. It is also Wayne's first number one on the Hot R&B/Hip-Hop Songs chart and the Hot Rap Tracks chart. On the Hot R&B/Hip-Hop Songs chart, it is the first rap song to reach number one since Ludacris' "Money Maker" in 2006. After one week, it slipped away from top spot, but returned three weeks later, making it the song with the longest break in between peaks in the Hot 100 since Usher's "U Got It Bad."

The week after the release, Wayne and Mariah Carey became the number one most added and greatest gainer at both radio formats with a total of 138 adds. "Lollipop" has become a crossover hit on mainstream radio, as it became his first top 40 hit as a lead artist, entering at number 36, and has so far peaked at number 5. It is his first top ten on the Pop 100, where it has reached number two. It returned to number one on the Billboard Hot 100 for the second time on May 22, 2008.

The song has become a top ten success in Canada, peaking at number 10 as of May 29, 2008, and his most successful song in the UK, where it reached number 26 on downloads alone. It reached number 3 on the New Zealand charts and was certified Platinum by the Recording Industry Association of New Zealand.

In 2008, "Lollipop" was the best-selling ringtone in the United States with over 2.3 million copies sold and the second best-selling digital song with over 3.1 million copies.

To date, "Lollipop" sold 4,176,000 digital copies in the United States.

Remixes and covers 
The official remix features Static Major and Kanye West. There is an extended version of the remix that has Wayne talking over the original bridge and singing an altered hook, with Kanye singing adlibs, along with a guitar riff near the end. Other remixes feature Young Jeezy, Gorilla Zoe, Ace Hood, Kurupt, V.I.C., Nicki Minaj, Wiz Khalifa, Tekitek, Rasheeda and Khia, who made a popular female version of the song. Another remix was made commemorating the 2008 NBA champion Boston Celtics. It features the instrumental used in the main song.

David Banner's song "Shawty Say" samples the opening part of the Lil Wayne's second verse for its chorus. JJ uses elements of "Lollipop" in their song "Ecstasy". Drake samples this song on his song "In My Feelings" from his fifth studio album, Scorpion.

Charts

Weekly charts

Year-end charts

Decade-end charts

All-time charts

Certifications

Framing Hanley cover 

The post-hardcore band Framing Hanley covered the song as a bonus track on their album The Moment. It uses a slight bit of talkbox, but replaces almost all the other sound with electric guitar, and features a hard rock version of the lyrics sung by the band. It was certified Gold by the Recording Industry Association of America for shipping 500,000 units in the United States.

See also 
List of Hot 100 number-one singles of 2008 (U.S.)
List of number-one R&B/hip-hop songs of 2008 (U.S.)
List of Billboard Rhythmic number-one songs of the 2000s

References

External links 

2007 songs
2008 singles
Lil Wayne songs
Framing Hanley songs
Billboard Hot 100 number-one singles
Cash Money Records singles
Song recordings produced by Jim Jonsin
Songs written by Lil Wayne
Songs written by Jim Jonsin
Music videos directed by Gil Green
Universal Music Group singles
Songs released posthumously